Kathryn Radabaugh Nightingale  is an American biomedical engineer in the field of medical ultrasound. She is the Theo Pilkington Professor of Biomedical Engineering at Duke University in Durham, North Carolina. Nightingale is also a Member of the Duke Cancer Institute and Bass Fellow in the Duke University Pratt School of Engineering.

Education 
Nightingale graduated magna cum laude with her bachelor's degree in electrical engineering from the Duke University Pratt School of Engineering in 1989.  In 1997, she obtained a Doctorate of Philosophy in biomedical engineering from the Duke University Graduate School of Arts at Sciences. Nightingale's thesis was entitled Ultrasonic Generation and Detection of Acoustic Streaming to Differentiate between Fluid-Filled and Solid Lesions in the Breast.

College athletics 
As a freshman, Nightingale was a member of the 1985-86 Duke Blue Devils women's basketball team, and made the Atlantic Coast Conference Honor Roll for that year.

Career

Research interests 
Nightingale's early work focused on acoustic streaming to differentiate fluid filled cysts and solid masses in the breast, which was the precursor to acoustic radiation force impulse (ARFI) imaging when it was determined that acoustic radiation force could induce displacements in soft tissue.

Nightingale's research interests center around ultrasound and elasticity imaging. She is specifically interested in acoustic streaming, acoustic radiation force, and nonlinear acoustics, especially for tissue characterization. She uses finite element modeling as well as phantom and clinical experiments to investigate these phenomena. Nightingale's clinical imaging interests include abdominal imaging, prostate imaging and muscle imaging.

Teaching 
BME 354L: Introduction to Medical Instrumentation
BME 542: Ultrasonic Imaging
BME 845: Elasticity Imaging

Professional societies 
Nightingale is a member of many professional and academic societies and advisory boards.

 National Advisory Council for Biomedical Imaging and Bioengineering
 American Institute for Medical and Biological Engineering, Fellow
 National Academy of Inventors, Fellow
 Institute of Electrical and Electronics Engineers, senior member
 American Institute of Ultrasound in Medicine
 Biomedical Engineering Society
 American Society for Engineering Education

Professional committees 
Nightingale has sat and sits on several professional committees.

 IEEE Transactions on Medical Imaging Steering Committee, 1999-2001
 IEEE Biotechnology Council, 2005-2007
 IEEE UFFC International Ultrasonics Symposium Technical Program Committee, 1998–present
 SPIE Medical Imaging Symposium Technical Program Committee, 2004-2006
 AIUM Annual Convention technical review committee, 2011-2015
 AIUM Chair of Subcommittee on Transiently Increased Output for Ultrasonic Imaging 2012-2017
 AIUM Technical Standards Committee, 2013-2017
 AIUM Basic Science and Instrumentation Community, 2013–present
 WFUMB Consensus Report on Elasticity Imaging, Faculty expert 2013-2015
 RSNA/QIBA Ultrasonic Shearwave Speed Technical Committee 2012–present

Conference and review panels 

Nightingale has sat on several grant review panels and has chaired several conference sessions.
 NIH BMIT-B Study Section Charter Member 2015–present
 NIH MEDI-A and CMIP Study Section (Ad-hoc member), 2004-2014
 NIH RNM Study Section (Ad-hoc member), 2003
 NIH Ad-hoc Ultrasound Study Section, 1999-2002
 Department of Defense, Breast Cancer Research Program, 1998
 Department of Defense, Prostate Cancer Research Training Program, 2010
 Chair, Sessions of IEEE UFFC Ultrasonics Symposium, 2000–2007, 2009-2018
 Chair, Sessions of BMES Annual Meeting, 2001, 2010
 Chair, Sessions of AIUM, 2011, 2013, 2015 - 2018

Awards and patents

Awards 

 Lois and John L. Imhoff Distinguished Teaching Award, Pratt School of Engineering, 2018
 Fellow, American Institute for Medical and Biological Engineering, 2016
 Capers and Marion McDonald Teaching and Research Award, Pratt School of Engineering, 2015
 Klein Family Distinguished Teaching Award, Pratt School of Engineering, 2007

Patents 

 Method and Apparatus for Delivery of Agents across the Blood Brain Barrier, in review, 2008. (Application No. 12/588,667) 
 Ultrasound methods, systems, and computer program products for imaging fluids, in review, 2009. (Application No. 12/407,979)
 Ultrasound methods, systems and computer program products for imaging fluids using acoustic radiation force, in review, 2011. (Application No. 13/312,278) 
 Methods, Systems and Computer Program Products for Estimating Shear Wave Speed Using Statistical Inference, (Application No. 14/801,007)
 Methods, systems and computer program products for constructive shear wave ultrasound imaging, in review, 2018 (Application No. 16/076,379)
 Adaptive Tracking Focal Configuration for Tissue Deformation Estimation, IDF submitted August, 2014, patent application in preparation, 2015.
 Systems and Methods for Determining Viscoelastic Properties in Soft Tissue Using Ultrasound (Provisional Application No. 62/404,793; Full Application filed October 2017).

References 

Living people
American biomedical engineers
Duke University Pratt School of Engineering alumni
Year of birth missing (living people)
American women engineers
Duke University faculty
American women academics
21st-century American women